Svojšín is a municipality and village in Tachov District in the Plzeň Region of the Czech Republic. It has about 400 inhabitants.

Administrative parts
Villages of Holyně, Nynkov and Řebří are administrative parts of Svojšín.

Notable people
Josef Wenig (1896–1981), German labour and political activist

References

Villages in Tachov District